The 14217 / 14218 Unchahar Express is an Express train belonging to Indian Railways – Northern Railways zone that runs between  and  in India.

It operates as train number 14217 from Prayag Junction to Chandigarh and as train number 14218 in the reverse direction. Earlier it used to start from Prayag Junction.

Coaches

The 14217/18 Prayag–Chandigarh Unchahar Express presently has 2 AC 2 tier, 3 AC 3 tier, 6 Sleeper class, 6 Second Class seating & 2 SLR (Seating cum Luggage Rake) coaches.

As with most train services in India, coach composition may be amended at the discretion of Indian Railways depending on demand.

Service

The 14217/18 Prayag–Chandigarh Unchahar Express covers the distance of 913 kilometers in 19 hours 20 mins as 14217 Prayag–Chandigarh Unchahar Express (47.22 km/hr) & in 18 hrs 15 mins as 14218 Chandigarh–Prayag Unchahar Express (48.48 km/hr).

As the average speed of the train is below 55 km/hr, as per Indian Railways rules, its fare does not include a Superfast surcharge.

Routeing

The 14217/14218 Unchahar Express runs from Prayag Junction via Kunda,  to Chandigarh.

Traction

A WAP-5 or WAP-7 electric locomotive from the Ghaziabad Loco Shed hauls the train from Prayagraj Sangam till Chandigarh Junction.

External links

References 

Trains from Allahabad
Named passenger trains of India
Rail transport in Haryana
Rail transport in Chandigarh
Rail transport in Delhi
Express trains in India